Vitezslav "Victor" Mucha (26 January 1921 – 2 August 1982) was an Australian wrestler. He competed in the men's Greco-Roman light heavyweight at the 1956 Summer Olympics.

References

External links
 

1921 births
1982 deaths
Australian male sport wrestlers
Olympic wrestlers of Australia
Wrestlers at the 1956 Summer Olympics
Sportspeople from Ostrava